Belmaneh-ye Sofla (also Romanized as Belmāneh-ye Soflá) is a village in Mahidasht Rural District, Mahidasht District, Kermanshah County, Kermanshah Province, Iran. At the 2006 census, its population was 161, in 39 families.

References 

Populated places in Kermanshah County